Rizwan Ahmed is a former Federal Secretary and grade 22 officer of the Pakistan Administrative Service who is currently serving as Member Sindh Public Service Commission (SPSC) since December 2022. He did his two-year Masters in Public Administration from Harvard University and joined the civil service in 1988. He was promoted to the country's highest civil service rank of grade 22 in 2017.

He first came to the fore when he saved more than PKR 7 billion of the national exchequer through a sweeping anti-corruption drive and commodity financing operation during his tenure as Chairman of the Trading Corporation of Pakistan.

Rizwan, in his capacity as Federal Secretary Maritime Affairs, became the first ever Pakistani to hold the chairmanship of INFOFISH, an intergovernmental organisation based in Kuala Lampur with several Asia-Pacific countries as its members including Pakistan, Iran, Malaysia, Bangladesh and Maldives.

In 2022 during Rizwan's tenure as Chairman of the Pakistan National Shipping Corporation, the national flag carrier earned a net profit of more than PKR 5 billion, the highest ever in the Corporation's history.

Family
Rizwan is the son of Jamil Ahmed, the former twice-elected Mayor of Hyderabad; and is the son-in-law of former FSC Chief Justice Haziqul Khairi.

Career
Rizwan Ahmed is currently serving as Member Sindh Public Service Commission, in office since 2022. He joined the Pakistan Administrative Service in January 1988 and retired from active civil service in December 2021 as a grade 22 officer.

He previously served in the Government of Pakistan as Federal Secretary for Maritime Affairs, Chairman of Trading Corporation of Pakistan, twice as Chairman of Pakistan National Shipping Corporation, Additional Secretary Establishment Division, Additional Secretary Cabinet Division and Managing Director of ENAR Petrotech.

Before joining the federal government, Rizwan served at the provincial level as Health Secretary of Sindh, Secretary General Administration (SGA&CD Sindh), Secretary to Governor Sindh, Additional Home Secretary Sindh and as Deputy Commissioner of Hyderabad. 

During the early stages of his career, he served as Director Local Government Bahawalpur Division and Assistant Commissioner of Rahim Yar Khan and Mianwali.

See also
Sikandar Sultan Raja
Fawad Hasan Fawad
Naveed Kamran Baloch

References

Pakistani civil servants
Harvard Kennedy School alumni
Year of birth missing (living people)
Living people
Government of Pakistan
People from Hyderabad, Sindh
Pakistani government officials
Cadet College Petaro alumni